The 2005 North Texas Mean Green football team represented the University of North Texas in the 2005 NCAA Division I-A football season.

Schedule
The team played two games that were rescheduled from their planned dates. The season opener was originally scheduled for September 3 against LSU, but due to aftereffects of Hurricane Katrina was moved to October 29. As a result, the Louisiana–Monroe game on that date was moved to November 19.

Schedule Source:

References

North Texas
North Texas Mean Green football seasons
North Texas Mean Green football